Saints Constantine and Helena (Bulgarian: Св. св. Константин и Елена) is a Bulgarian Orthodox church in Edirne. It was built in 1869 in less than seven months and is a prime example of the Eastern Orthodox church architecture of the period.

Location
The church is located in Edirne, in the district of "Abdurahman", in the neighborhood of "Uzunkaldırım".

History
The church was heavily renovated in 2008  after long years of abandonment. The renovation project was partially funded by the Bulgarian government.

References

Churches completed in 1869
19th-century Eastern Orthodox church buildings
Buildings and structures in Edirne
Bulgarian Orthodox churches in Turkey
1869 establishments in the Ottoman Empire
19th-century churches in Turkey